The Pakistan women's national cycling team represents Pakistan in international cycling competitions. It is administered by the Pakistan Cycling Federation (PCF). Members of the team compete in individual and team events at competitions including regional games (South Asian Games).

Members

Results

South Asian Games

References

Women's national team
Cycling
Women's sport in Pakistan